Alberto Cecchin (born 8 August 1989) is an Italian former professional cyclist, who rode professionally between 2013 and 2017 for the ,  and  teams.

Major results

2011
 3rd Trofeo Alcide Degasperi
2012
 10th Trofeo Franco Balestra
2013
 1st Points classification Tour de Korea
 6th Coppa Bernocchi
 8th Overall Flèche du Sud
1st Stage 4
 10th Overall Tour de Hokkaido
2014
 1st Stage 1a (TTT) Giro della Regione Friuli Venezia Giulia
 4th Trofeo Alcide Degasperi
 9th Giro del Medio Brenta
2015
 1st Trofeo Alcide Degasperi
 1st Stage 2 Ronde van Midden-Nederland
 3rd Paris–Chauny
 4th Grand Prix de la ville de Nogent-sur-Oise
 4th Grand Prix des Marbriers
 6th Trofeo Edil C
 9th Tour de Berne
 10th Rund um Köln
2016
 2nd GP Adria Mobil
 4th Overall Tour of Qinghai Lake
 4th Dorpenomloop Rucphen
2017
 3rd Overall Tour de Langkawi
 4th Overall Tour of China II
 6th Overall Tour de Korea

References

External links
 
 

1989 births
Living people
Italian male cyclists
People from Feltre
Cyclists from the Province of Belluno